Belphegor's prime is the palindromic prime number  (1030 + 666 × 1014 + 1), a number which reads the same both backwards and forwards and is only divisible by itself and one. It was discovered by Harvey Dubner. The name Belphegor refers to one of the Seven Princes of Hell, who was charged with helping people make ingenious inventions and discoveries.
"Belphegor's prime" is a name coined by author Clifford A. Pickover.
The number itself contains superstitious elements that have given it its name: the number 666 at the heart of Belphegor's Prime is widely associated as being the Number of the Beast, used in symbolism to represent one of the creatures in the Apocalypse or, more commonly, the Devil. This number is surrounded on either side by thirteen zeroes and is 31 digits in length (thirteen reversed), with thirteen itself long regarded superstitiously as an unlucky number in Western culture.

In the short scale, this number would be named "One nonillion, sixty-six quadrillion, six hundred trillion and one". In the long scale, this number's name would be "One quintillion, sixty-six billiard, six hundred billion and one".

See also
 Prime number
 Palindrome

References

External links
Belphegor's Prime: 1000000000000066600000000000001 from Clifford Pickover
Belphegors's Prime and the Belphegor's numbers sequence (A232449) at The On-Line Encyclopedia of Integer Sequences

Prime numbers
Superstitions about numbers